Bélier is the French word for a ram. It may also refer to:

Bélier (rocket)
Bélier Region, Ivory Coast
La Famille Bélier 2014 French comedy-drama film directed by Éric Lartigau
Groupe Bélier, patriotes jurassiens (UPJ). A youth group of militant separatists known as the Béliers formed in 1963 in Switzerland
Bélier, French medieval battering ram
Sandrine Bélier (1973–) French Green politician
French destroyer Bélier